Heftziba is a kibbutz in northern Israel. Located on the boundaries of the Jezreel and Beit She'an Valleys between the cities of Afula and Beit She'an, it falls under the jurisdiction of Gilboa Regional Council.

History
The kibbutz was founded in 1922 by Jewish immigrants from Czechoslovakia and Germany. It was named after the farm adjacent to Hadera, where the original settlers worked before they relocated and founded the community. Originally the name derives from the Bible, where God speaks about his love for Israel: "My delight in her." (Isaiah 62:4)

According to the 1922 census of Palestine conducted in 1922 by the British Mandate authorities, Heftziba had a population of 125 inhabitants, consisting of 123 Jews and 2 Muslims.

The nearby Palestinian village of Ṣaffūriya had been almost emptied of its 4000 inhabitants in July 1948 during the 1948 Arab–Israeli War. By early January 1949, about  500 villagers had filtered back, but "neighbouring settlements coveted Saffuriya lands". The "Northern Front" ordered the villagers eviction, which was carried out the 7th of January 1949. Land in Saffuriya was then distributed to its neighbouring Jewish settlements. 

In February 1949, 1000 Dunams of land in Ṣaffūriya was given to Heftziba.

On Thursday, July 24, 1986, at approximately 5:00 PM, ten teenager members of the kibbutz were killed following a head-on collision with a semi-trailer, while driving back from a summer camp. The disaster left a mark of terrible sadness on the kibbutz, and a long-standing conflict between some of the kibbutz members.

Archaeology
The Beth Alpha Synagogue National Park is located in the kibbutz, not, as many assume, at the adjacent kibbutz with the same name, Beit Alfa. It contains an ancient Byzantine-era synagogue with a mosaic floor depicting the lunar Hebrew months as they correspond to the signs of the zodiac. The synagogue as well as the nearby kibbutz got their name from the Arab village that once stood here, Khirbet Bait Ilfa.

Makuya
Makuya students have been sent to kibbutzim in Israel to study Hebrew and the biblical background. Some of them continue their academic studies in universities. The primary kibbutz the Makuya students stay at is Heftziba.

Notable people

 Arthur Koestler, attempted to join the kibbutz, but his application was refused after a vote

References 

Czechoslovak Jews
Czech-Jewish culture in Israel
German-Jewish culture in Israel
Slovak-Jewish culture in Israel
Kibbutzim
Kibbutz Movement
Populated places established in 1922
Populated places in Northern District (Israel)
1922 establishments in Mandatory Palestine